Hardin is a village in Calhoun County, Illinois, United States. The population was 801 at the 2020 census, down from 967 at the 2010 census. It is the county seat of Calhoun County.

Geography
Hardin is located at  (39.158271, −90.618239).

Demographics

As of the 2020 census there were 801 people, 263 households, and 192 families residing in the village. The racial makeup of the village was 95.01% White, 0.12% African American, 0.12% Native American, 0.50% Asian, 1.50% from other races, and 2.75% from two or more races. Hispanic or Latino of any race were 1.62% of the population.

There were 263 households, out of which 63.50% had children under the age of 18 living with them, 63.88% were married couples living together, 5.32% had a female householder with no husband present, and 27.00% were non-families. 25.86% of all households were made up of individuals, and 11.41% had someone living alone who was 65 years of age or older. The average household size was 3.47 and the average family size was 2.82.

The village's age distribution consisted of 21.1% under the age of 18, 5.4% from 18 to 24, 16.5% from 25 to 44, 31% from 45 to 64, and 26.1% who were 65 years of age or older. The median age was 49.8 years. For every 100 females, there were 90.6 males. For every 100 females age 18 and over, there were 91.8 males.

The median income for a household in the village was $55,938, and the median income for a family was $78,846. Males had a median income of $37,917 versus $27,450 for females. The per capita income for the village was $24,596. About 15.1% of families and 20.3% of the population were below the poverty line, including 24.0% of those under age 18 and 7.1% of those age 65 or over.

Early history
Hardin was first known as Terry's Landing, after its first settler, Dr. William Terry, according to John Lammy's American Centennial celebration speech in Hardin on July 4, 1876. Benjamin F. Childs bought the landing in 1835 and renamed it Childs' Landing. The village name was changed to Hardin when it became the county seat of Calhoun County in 1847. The new name honored John J. Hardin, a former congressman and a colonel in the First Regiment of Illinois Volunteers, who was killed earlier that year in the Mexican–American War. Hardin became the seat of Calhoun County after the county courthouse had burned down in Gilead. The seat was temporarily moved to Hamburg, but after an offer from Benjamin Childs of five acres of land and fifty thousand bricks for the new courthouse, as well as a free barbeque dinner, it was decided in a vote that the county seat would be moved in 1847.

Notable people
Thomas D. Bare (1867–1931), Illinois newspaper editor and state senator, lived in Hardin
Jerry Corbett (1917–1997), businessman, baseball player, and politician, was born in Hardin
Bill McGee (1909–1987), major league baseball pitcher for the St. Louis Cardinals and the New York Giants

References

External links
Great River Road: Hardin
Masonic Lodge of Hardin

Villages in Calhoun County, Illinois
Villages in Illinois
County seats in Illinois